Ferdinand Bonn (20 December 1861 – 24 September 1933) was a German stage and film actor.

Bonn was born in Donauwörth, Bavaria, Germany and died at age 71 in Berlin.

Selected filmography
 Svengali (1914)
 The Silent Mill (1914)
 Laugh Bajazzo (1915)
 Robert and Bertram (1915)
 Tales of Hoffmann (1916)
 Professor Erichsons Rivale (1916)
 The Spy (1917)
The Mexican (1918)
 Prostitution (1919)
 The Moon of Israel (1924)
 The Curse (1924)
 Rags and Silk (1925)
 The Golden Butterfly (1926)
 The Bank Crash of Unter den Linden (1926)
 The Woman in Gold (1926)
 When I Came Back (1926)
 The White Horse Inn (1926)
 The Gypsy Baron (1927)
 The Transformation of Dr. Bessel (1927)
 A Crazy Night (1927)
 Always Be True and Faithful (1927)
 The False Prince (1927)
 You Walk So Softly (1928)
 Strauss Is Playing Today (1928)
 Rasputins Liebesabenteuer (1928)
 Misled Youth (1929)
 The Woman in the Advocate's Gown (1929)
 The Great Longing (1930)
 Danube Waltz (1930)
 Dreyfus (1930)
 A Storm Over Zakopane (1931)
 A Waltz by Strauss (1931)
 In the Employ of the Secret Service (1931)
 Frederica (1932)

Bibliography
 Grange, William. Historical Dictionary of German Theater. Scarecrow Press, 2006.

External links

 
 
 

1861 births
1933 deaths
German male film actors
German male stage actors
German male silent film actors
People from Donauwörth
20th-century German male actors